Gachavi-ye Mozaffarabad (also Romanized as Gachavī-ye Moz̧affarābād) is a village in Abdan Rural District, in the Central District of Deyr County, Bushehr Province, Iran. At the 2006 census, its population was 47, in 9 families.

References 

Populated places in Deyr County